The Turnbull River is a short river on the West Coast of New Zealand's South Island. The Turnbull shares its mouth with the Okuru River.

Westland District
Rivers of the West Coast, New Zealand
Rivers of New Zealand